George Clark Payne (17 February 1887 – 1932) was an English professional footballer who played as an inside left. He is mostly noted for his two years in the Southern League with Crystal Palace. Payne also played for Football League clubs Sunderland and Woolwich Arsenal and in the Southern League for Tottenham Hotspur and Leyton.

Career
Payne joined Southern League First Division club Tottenham Hotspur in 1906 and stayed with the club until its election to the Football League in 1908. Following two seasons back in the Southern League with Crystal Palace, for whom he scored prolifically, he transferred to First Division club Sunderland in 1911. After just two appearances, Payne returned to the Southern League with Leyton in January 1912. He made a return to the First Division during the 1912 off-season with Woolwich Arsenal. Payne made just three first team appearances for the Gunners and predominantly played in the South Eastern League with the club's reserves, with whom he scored 9 goals in 16 appearances. He left the club at the end of the 1912–13 season. Serious wounds suffered in combat during the First World War brought an end to Payne's career.

Personal life 
Payne was married to Miriam, sister of Hitchin-born footballing brothers George, Harry, Vic and Willie Furr. Payne served as a private in the Bedfordshire Regiment during the First World War and his football career was ended by a gunshot wound to the left thigh suffered in September 1918.

Career statistics

References 

1887 births
1932 deaths
Sportspeople from Hitchin
English footballers
Association football inside forwards
Hitchin Town F.C. players
Tottenham Hotspur F.C. players
Crystal Palace F.C. players
Sunderland A.F.C. players
Leyton F.C. players
Arsenal F.C. players
Southern Football League players
English Football League players
British Army personnel of World War I
Military personnel from Hertfordshire

Bedfordshire and Hertfordshire Regiment soldiers